For the 1998 crime drama film, see Route 9 (film)
Route 9, or Highway 9, may refer to:

International
 European route E09 
 European route E009

Albania
 SH-9 Road in Albania.

Argentina
 National Route 9

Australia

New South Wales 
 A9 (Sydney)

South Australia 
 
 Port River Expressway
 Salisbury Highway
 John Rice Avenue

Tasmania 
 Arthur Highway, Tasmania

Austria
 Pyhrn Autobahn

Belarus

Bulgaria
 I-9 road (Bulgaria)

Canada
 Alberta Highway 9
 British Columbia Highway 9
 Manitoba Highway 9
 Ontario Highway 9
 Prince Edward Island Route 9
 Quebec Route 9 (former)
 Saskatchewan Highway 9
 Yukon Highway 9

Czech Republic
 I/9 Highway; Czech: Silnice I/9

Denmark
Danish national road 9

Djibouti
  RN-9 (Djibouti)

Finland
 Finnish national road 9

Germany
 Bundesautobahn 9

Hong Kong
 Route 9 (Hong Kong)

Hungary
 M9 expressway (Hungary)

India
  National Highway 9 (India)

Indonesia
  Indonesian National Route 9

Iran
 Freeway 9 (Iran)

Iraq
Highway 9 (Iraq)

Ireland
 M9 motorway (Republic of Ireland)
 N9 road (Ireland)

Israel
 Highway 9 (Israel)

Italy
 Autostrada A9
 RA 9

Japan

Korea, South

Malaysia
 Malaysia Federal Route 9

Norway 
 Norwegian National Road 9

Paraguay
 National Route 9

Philippines
 N9 highway (Philippines)

Russia
 M9 highway (Russia)

United States
 Interstate 9 (proposed)
 U.S. Route 9
 U.S. Route 9W
 U.S. Route 9E (former)
 New England Interstate Route 9 (former)
 Alabama State Route 9
 Alaska Route 9
 Arkansas Highway 9
 California State Route 9
 Colorado State Highway 9
 Connecticut Route 9
 Delaware Route 9
 Florida State Road 9
 Georgia State Route 9
 Idaho State Highway 9
 Illinois Route 9
 Indiana State Road 9
 Iowa Highway 9
 K-9 (Kansas highway)
 Kentucky Route 9
 Louisiana Highway 9
 Maine State Route 9
 Massachusetts Route 9
 Massachusetts Route C9 (former)
 M-9 (Michigan highway) (former)
 Minnesota State Highway 9
 Mississippi Highway 9
 Missouri Route 9
 Missouri Route 9 (1922) (former)
 Nebraska Highway 9
 Nevada State Route 9 (former)
 New Hampshire Route 9
 New Jersey Route 9 (former)
 New Mexico State Road 9
New York State Route 9 (1924–1927) (former)
 North Carolina Highway 9
 North Dakota Highway 9
 Ohio State Route 9
 Oklahoma State Highway 9
 Pennsylvania Route 9 (former)
 South Carolina Highway 9
 South Dakota Highway 9 (former)
 Tennessee State Route 9
 Texas State Highway 9
 Texas State Highway Loop 9
 Texas State Highway Spur 9
 Farm to Market Road 9
 Texas Recreational Road 9
 Utah State Route 9
 Vermont Route 9
 Virginia State Route 9
 Washington State Route 9
 Primary State Highway 9 (Washington) (former)
 West Virginia Route 9
Territories
 Guam Highway 9
 Puerto Rico Highway 9

Uruguay 
  Route 9 Gral. Leonardo Olivera

Vietnam
National Route 9 (Vietnam)

See also
 List of A9 roads
 List of highways numbered 9A
 List of highways numbered 9B
 List of highways numbered 9E
 List of highways numbered 9W